The likin or lijin was a form of internal tariff in the Chinese Empire and Republic, which was first introduced as a means of financing the largely locally recruited armies to suppress the Taiping Rebellion.

History
The lijin tax was first introduced in 1853 by censor Lei Yixian
in the area around Yangzhou as a way of raising funds in the campaigns against local rebels. As the central government was short of revenue, the imperial court sanctioned the tax and it quickly became an important source of funds for the campaign against the Taiping and Nian rebellions.

The tax was levied on an ad valorem basis on goods in transit between provinces and on shops, with rates ranging from 2 to 10 per cent. After the Taipings were suppressed in 1864, the likin became a permanent feature of the Chinese tax system and it became an important source of revenue for local government, as China had lost its external tariff autonomy after the conclusion of the Treaty of Nanking. In many ways, the tax signified the decentralization of state authority in the wake of the Taiping rebellion.

Foreign merchants in the treaty ports believed that the likin tax, as a form of tariff acting against western as well as local goods, was a violation of the treaties which China had concluded with the West. Consequently, foreign merchants made a number of unsuccessful attempts to pressure the Chinese government to abolish it, including the Chefoo Convention. It survived the fall of the Qing dynasty into the Warlord Era and was not ended until 1 January 1931.

See also
Chinese Maritime Customs Service
Self-Strengthening Movement
Taxation in premodern China
Guo Songtao

References

Citations

Bibliography
Beal, Edwin George. The Origin of Likin, 1853–1864. Cambridge: Harvard University Press, 1958.

Taxation in China
Economy of the Qing dynasty
1853 establishments in China
1931 disestablishments in China
Taiping Rebellion
Economic history of China